Rosa Brooks ( Ehrenreich; born 1970) is an American law professor, journalist, author and commentator on foreign policy, U.S. politics and criminal justice. She is the Scott K. Ginsburg Professor of Law and Policy at Georgetown University Law Center. Brooks is also an adjunct scholar at West Point's Modern War Institute and a senior fellow at the New America Foundation. From April 2009 to July 2011, Brooks was a counselor to Under Secretary of Defense for Policy Michèle Flournoy.

Brooks is a commentator on politics and foreign policy. She served as a columnist and contributing editor for Foreign Policy and as a weekly columnist for the Los Angeles Times. Brooks authored the 2016 book How Everything Became War and the Military Became Everything and the 2021 book Tangled Up in Blue: Policing the American City, which is based on her five years as a reserve police officer in Washington, D.C.

At Georgetown Law, Brooks founded the Center for Innovations in Community Safety, formerly the Innovative Policing Program, which in 2017 launched the Police for Tomorrow Fellowship Program with Washington, D.C.'s Metropolitan Police Department. She founded the Leadership Council for Women in National Security and the Transition Integrity Project. In 2021, Washingtonian magazine listed Brooks as one of Washington's 250 "most influential people."

Early life and education 
Rosa Brooks is the daughter of author Barbara Ehrenreich (née Alexander) and psychologist John Ehrenreich. Her parents separated when she was young. Her brother is journalist and author Ben Ehrenreich. Brooks was born in a public clinic in New York.  She studied at Syosset High School in Syosset, New York but left early to attend Harvard. In 1991, she earned a Bachelor of Arts (history and literature) from Harvard University.

While an undergraduate, Brooks served as president of the Phillips Brooks House Association, Harvard's undergraduate public service organization. She graduated Phi Beta Kappa and was a Marshall Scholar at Christ Church, Oxford. In 1993, Brooks received a Master of Studies from Oxford University in Social anthropology. In 1996, she received a J.D. from Yale Law School.

Career 
Brooks was a lecturer at Yale Law School, where she was the director of Yale Law School's human rights program. She was a fellow at the Carr Center for Human Rights Policy at Harvard's Kennedy School of Government, a board member of Amnesty International USA and a member of the Executive Council of the American Society of International Law. Brooks served on the board of the Open Society Foundation's US Programs Fund. Brooks was a senior advisor at the US Department of State’s Bureau of Democracy, Human Rights and Labor. Brooks was a consultant for the Open Society Institute and Human Rights Watch.

Brooks was a member of the Policy Committee of the National Security Network. From 2001 to 2006, she was an associate professor at the University of Virginia School of Law. Brooks has been a columnist for the Los Angeles Times (June 2005 to April 9, 2009) and, since 2007, a professor at the Georgetown University Law Center.

From April 2009 to July 2011, was on public service leave from Georgetown to serve as counselor to Under Secretary of Defense for Policy, Michele Flournoy. She received the Secretary of Defense Medal for Outstanding Public Service for her work at the Defense Department.

Brooks currently serves on the board of the Harper's Magazine Foundation, the Advisory Committee of National Security Action and the Steering Committee of the Leadership Council for Women in National Security.

From 2016 to 2020, she was also a reserve police officer with the Metropolitan Police Department of the District of Columbia, and she received the Chief of Police Special Award in 2019.

Writings 
Brooks' scholarly work has focused mostly on national security, terrorism and rule of law issues, international law, human rights, law of war and failed states. Along with Jane Stromseth and David Wippman, Brooks coauthored Can Might Make Rights? Building the Rule of Law After Military Interventions (2006). Brooks is also the author of numerous scholarly articles published in law reviews.

Brooks authored the 2016 book How Everything Became War and the Military Became Everything. It was a New York Times Notable Book of the Year and was selected by Military Times as one of the ten best books of the year. The book was also shortlisted for the Lionel Gelber Prize and the Arthur Ross Book Award.

In 2021, she published Tangled Up in Blue: Policing the American City, which is about her experience as a reserve police officer in Washington, D.C.

Political commentary 
In addition to her columns for the Los Angeles Times and Foreign Policy, Brooks was a founder of Foreign Policy'''s weekly podcast, The E.R., and is now a member of the Deep State Radio podcast team. She has been a frequent guest and panelist on MSNBC, Fox, CNN and NPR. Brooks has contributed op-eds and book reviews to the Washington Post, The New York Times, The Atlantic, The Wall Street Journal and numerous other publications.

 Personal life 
Brooks has two children. Brooks was previously married to the Yale literary critic Peter Brooks, and is now married to LTC Joseph Mouer, a now-retired Army Special Forces officer.

 Works Tangled Up in Blue: Policing the Nation's Capital, Penguin, 2021, How Everything Became War and the Military Became Everything, Simon and Schuster, 2016, 
 Rosa Brooks, Jane Stromseth, David Wippman, Can Might Make Rights? Building the Rule of Law After Military Interventions, Cambridge University Press, 2006, 
 A Garden of Paper Flowers: An American at Oxford'', Picador, 1994,  (under the name Rosa Ehrenreich; later articles are credited to Rosa Ehrenreich Brooks)

References

External links
 
 Profile at Georgetown University Law Center
 

1970 births
Living people
Alumni of Christ Church, Oxford
American foreign policy writers
American legal scholars
American legal writers
American women lawyers
Clinton administration personnel
Harvard College alumni
International law scholars
International relations scholars
Obama administration personnel
Lawyers from New York City
Los Angeles Times people
Marshall Scholars
People from Syosset, New York
Syosset High School alumni
United States Department of Defense officials
American women legal scholars
Women political scientists
Writers from New York City
Yale Law School alumni
Georgetown University Law Center faculty
21st-century American women